Valliniello, also known as Navarro and officially named as Valliniello / Navarro, is one of six parishes (administrative divisions)  in Avilés, a municipality within the province and autonomous community of Asturias, in northern Spain.

Villages

References 

Parishes in Avilés